Shalini Passi is an Indian Art and Design collector, Art, Design and Fashion Patron, philanthropist, Art Advisor and an Artist based in New Delhi.Passi is as well the Creative Director of Pasco group of companies.

Passi held a well-received exhibition entitled 'The Warp and Weft of Perception' and a solo art exhibition of paintings titled "Through my Eyes" at the Visual Arts Gallery in New Delhi.

Shalini's art collection includes works by Indian contemporary artists including Riyas Komu, M. F. Husain Anita Dube, Zarina Hashmi, Subodh Gupta, and Atul Dodiya, and Bharti Kher as well as international artists including Jeff Koons, Damien Hirst, and Vladimir Kagan.

Passi was educated at the Modern School Barakhamba Road New Delhi. She finished her graduation from Jesus and Mary College New Delhi.

Philanthropy 
Since 2010, Passi has been actively involved in educating underprivileged children in Delhi, through a series of workshops that provide opportunities for them to learn about the arts and crafts with skilled individuals. She supports and donates for "The Delhi Society for the Welfare of Special Children".

Passi is a member of the Advisory Board of Khoj (the not-for-profit contemporary arts organisation based in Delhi) since 2012, which facilitates and supports the development of experimental contemporary art practice in India and South Asia. She is also a Patron of the Kochi-Muziris Biennale.

In 2018, Passi started her own foundation, The Shalini Passi Art Foundation, and MASH which explores the intersection of the arts and promotes emerging artists in India.

Passi regularly loans works from her collection to exhibitions and prestigious art events, including Kusum by Mrinalini Mukherjee, which was loaned to the Kochi-Muziris Biennale in 2018.

In February 2021, Shalini Passi along with her Spouse Sanjay Passi donated a generous amount of Ten Crore Rupees to Tirumala Tirupati Devasthanams.

In 2021, Passi raised funds for Covid Relief India by organizing an Online Exhibition.

In September 2022, Shalini Passi organized “MASH Young Artists’ Exhibition: Fleeting Identities” which aimed at fostering search for and recognize visual artists with an unfiltered and transparent process of Open Call. From the open call, 10 artists practicing via diverse mediums were shortlisted to showcase their works at India International Centre, New Delhi, from 19 September to 29 September 2022. 
In addition, Passi also documented the culture and lives of the unsuspecting locals of Pahalgam in a series of photographs for the exhibition,  "Known Unknown: Pahalgam" , wherein she captured the innocence and femininity of the natives.

References

External links

Moral Moda Magazine Foundation, page2
Sustainable Fashion on Career Ahead Magazine

Indian art collectors
Living people
Indian patrons of the arts
Year of birth missing (living people)
Place of birth missing (living people)
Indian philanthropists